August Bøge (28 March 1892 – 12 October 1976) was a Danish footballer. He played in one match for the Denmark national football team in 1926.

References

External links
 

1892 births
1976 deaths
Danish men's footballers
Denmark international footballers
People from Korsør
Association football forwards
Boldklubben af 1893 players